Aron Muniz Teixeira da Silva (born 2 December 1983) is a Brazilian retired footballer who played as a forward.

Career
Aron Da Silva scored fifteen goals for Chula United F.C. in the 2010 Thai Division 1 League season. Newly promoted Sriracha F.C. signed him for their 2011 Thai Premier League campaign. He then went to Songkhla United and after that, he came to Army United. He made his debut for Army United against Chonburi.

External links

1983 births
Living people
Footballers from Rio de Janeiro (city)
Brazilian footballers
Association football forwards
Expatriate footballers in Thailand
Expatriate footballers in Indonesia
Aron da Silva
Aron da Silva
Aron da Silva
Aron da Silva
Aron da Silva
Persib Bandung players
Aron da Silva
Aron da Silva
Aron da Silva
Aron da Silva
Aron da Silva
Aron da Silva
Brazilian expatriate footballers
Brazilian expatriate sportspeople in Thailand
Brazilian expatriate sportspeople in Indonesia